Besik Amashukeli (born 1 June 1972) is a retired Georgian professional football player.

External links
 

1972 births
Living people
Footballers from Georgia (country)
Association football midfielders
Expatriate footballers from Georgia (country)
Expatriate footballers in Russia
Russian Premier League players
FC Lada-Tolyatti players
PFC Spartak Nalchik players
FC Zestafoni players
FC Mertskhali Ozurgeti players
FC Samtredia players
FC Kolkheti-1913 Poti players
FC Lokomotivi Tbilisi players
FC Tbilisi players